Gölhisar (literal translation: "lake castle") is a town in Burdur Province in the Mediterranean region of Turkey. It is the seat of Gölhisar District. Its population is 16,118 (2021).

History
During antiquity Golhisar was site of an ancient city called Kibyra, the capital of a tetrapolis comprising Kiyra itself, Bubon, Balbura and Inuanda, which according to Herodotus were founded by the Pisidians around 1000BC, Roman ruins including a 180 meter wide theater can be still seen. In the Byzantine era the town was the seat of a Christian Bishopric.

Ibn Battuta visited the small town of Qul Hisar, noting "There is no way to reach it except by a path like a bridge constructed between the rushes and the water, and broad enough only for one horse-man."

Gölhisar became a district on January 13, 1953 with the merger of Uluköy and Horzum Districts.  It got its name from the fortress (fortress) built on the island in the middle of the lake, 6 km from the district.

See also
Kibyra

References

Populated places in Burdur Province
Towns in Turkey
Gölhisar District